King of the Kill is the fourth album by Canadian heavy metal band Annihilator, released in 1994. This was the first Annihilator album not released on Roadrunner Records, and marked a return to the thrash metal sound of their earlier albums, Alice in Hell and Never, Neverland, after the commercial failure of its predecessor Set the World on Fire, while also retaining some of that album's radio-friendly sound. King of the Kill was also the first of three consecutive studio albums to feature guitarist and bandleader Jeff Waters on both lead vocals and bass.

Track listing

Credits
Jeff Waters – vocals, guitars, bass
Randy Black – drums

References

Annihilator (band) albums
1994 albums
CMC International albums